Susanne Gunnarsson (née Wiberg; born 8 September 1963 in Katrineholm) is a Swedish sprint canoer and marathon canoeist who competed from the early 1980s to the late 1990s. Competing in four Summer Olympics, she won three medals with one gold (1996: K-2 500 m) and two silvers (1984: K-4 500 m, 1992: K-2 500 m).

Gunnarsson also won nine medals at the ICF Canoe Sprint World Championships with a gold (K-1 5000 m: 1993), three silvers (K-2 200 m: 1995, K-2 500 m: 1981, K-4 200 m: 1998), and five bronzes (K-1 500 m: 1995, K-2 500 m: 1983, 1995; K-2 1000 m: 1998, K-4 500 m: 1981).

She was awarded the Svenska Dagbladet Gold Medal in 1996, jointly with Agneta Andersson.

References

External links
 
 

1963 births
Canoeists at the 1984 Summer Olympics
Canoeists at the 1988 Summer Olympics
Canoeists at the 1992 Summer Olympics
Canoeists at the 1996 Summer Olympics
Living people
Olympic canoeists of Sweden
Olympic gold medalists for Sweden
Olympic silver medalists for Sweden
Swedish female canoeists
Olympic medalists in canoeing
ICF Canoe Sprint World Championships medalists in kayak
Medalists at the 1996 Summer Olympics
Medalists at the 1992 Summer Olympics
Medalists at the 1984 Summer Olympics
People from Katrineholm Municipality
Sportspeople from Södermanland County